Dystomorphus is a genus of longhorn beetles of the subfamily Lamiinae.

Species 
Dystomorphus contains the following species:
 Dystomorphus diversus Holzschuh & Lin, 2017
 Dystomorphus esakii Hayashi, 1974
 Dystomorphus nigrosignatus Pu, Wang & Li, 1998
 Dystomorphus niisatoi Holzschuh & Lin, 2017
 Dystomorphus notatus Pic, 1926
 Dystomorphus piceae Holzschuh, 2003
 Dystomorphus sichuanensis Yu, 1994

References

Saperdini